Jack Deal (April 5, 1905 – February 1983) was a former U.S. soccer forward.  He played five seasons in the American Soccer League  and earned two caps with the U.S. national team, one at the 1928 Summer Olympics.

National team
Deal earned two caps with the U.S. national team in 1928.  The first came at the 1928 Summer Olympics when the U.S. lost to Argentina 11-2.  Following this loss, the U.S. tied Poland, 3-3, on June 10, 1928.

Club career
In 1928, Deal played for Wolfenden Shore F.C. in the Allied American Football Association.  He then went on to score eleven goals for the Philadelphia Centennials of the Eastern Professional Soccer League in the spring of 1929.  He may have played the first half of the 1928-1929 season, but he did not make the goals list.  At the end of the season, Philadelphia withdrew from the league and in August 1929, Deal signed with New York Hispano. However, at some time during the 1929-1930 season, he played two games, scoring two goals with the Newark Skeeters.  The ESL continued to exist through 1930 when it folded.  Deal’s career becomes difficult to follow after 1929.  After the collapse of the first American Soccer League (ASL) in spring 1933, it was quickly replaced by the second ASL that fall.  Deal then played for the Philadelphia German-Americans from 1933 through at least 1935 when they won the league title.  He then continued to play in the ASL until 1938, seeing time with Brooklyn Hispano and ending with Philadelphia Passon.

References

1905 births
1983 deaths
American soccer players
American Soccer League (1933–1983) players
Brooklyn Hispano players
Uhrik Truckers players
Philadelphia Nationals players
Eastern Professional Soccer League (1928–29) players
Philadelphia Centennials (soccer) players
New York Hispano players
American Soccer League (1921–1933) players
Newark Skeeters players
Footballers at the 1928 Summer Olympics
Olympic soccer players of the United States
United States men's international soccer players
Soccer players from Philadelphia
Association football forwards